Stenella novae-zelandiae is a species of anamorphic fungi.

References

External links

novae-zelandiae
Fungi described in 1985